Camille Vella-Wilkinson (born December 29, 1956) is an American politician who has served in the Rhode Island House of Representatives from the 21st district since 2017.

References

1956 births
Living people
Democratic Party members of the Rhode Island House of Representatives
21st-century American politicians